Blackfriars Academy (formerly Blackfriars School) is a mixed special school of approximately 200 pupils, covering an age range of 11 to 19, with a range of physical, learning, medical and sensory needs who come from North and Central Staffordshire and the Unitary Authority of Stoke-on-Trent. The school is based in Newcastle-Under-Lyme, Staffordshire, England.

History 
Blackfriars Academy opened in September 1960. It was granted High Performing Specialist Status in February 2006. One of the first Beacon Schools, the school is also part of the Leading Edge Partnership programme. It is also integrated into the community due to its Technology College status. In October 2014 the school converted to academy status as part of the Shaw Education Trust. the school was then renamed Blackfriars Academy.

Staffing 
The schools teams of staff consist of teachers, teaching assistants, physiotherapists, speech therapists, medical and social agencies and ancillary staff.

Notable former pupils
Denise Leigh, winner of Channel 4's Operatunity
Paul Henshall, actor

External links
Blackfriars Academy official website

Educational institutions established in 1960
Special schools in Staffordshire
1960 establishments in England
Academies in Staffordshire
Newcastle-under-Lyme
Shaw Education Trust